Il Commissario Pepe  or Police Chief Pepe is a 1969 Italian comedy – drama film directed by Ettore Scola.

It is based on a Ugo Facco De La Garda's novel.

Filmed in Vicenza, the city is never mentioned.

Awards
Ugo Tognazzi was named Best Actor at Mar del Plata Film Festival.

Plot
Antonio Pepe is the Chief Police Inspector of a provincial small city in North of Italy. He is forced to investigate the sexual life of the citizens, even to the local high society members.

Cast

Ugo Tognazzi as Antonio Pepe
 Giuseppe Maffioli as Nicola Parigi
Silvia Dionisio as Silvia
Tano Cimarosa as Agent Cariddi 
 Marianne Comtell as Matilde Carroni 
Dana Ghia as Sister Clementina 
 Elsa Vazzoler as Old Prostitute
Véronique Vendell as Maristella Diotallevi 
 Rita Calderoni as Clara Cerveteri 
 Virgilio Scapin as Count Lancillotto
 Elena Persiani as Marquise Norma Zaccarin 
Gino Santercole as Oreste
Pippo Starnazza as The Drunkard

External links 
 

1969 films
Films set in Veneto
Films shot in Veneto
1960s Italian-language films
Italian comedy-drama films
Films directed by Ettore Scola
1969 comedy-drama films
Films with screenplays by Ruggero Maccari
Films scored by Armando Trovajoli
Police detective films
Films with screenplays by Ettore Scola
1960s Italian films